Vandenberg Space Force Base , previously Vandenberg Air Force Base, is a United States Space Force Base in Santa Barbara County, California. Established in 1941, Vandenberg Space Force Base is a space launch base, launching spacecraft from the Western Range, and also performs missile testing. The United States Space Force's Space Launch Delta 30 serves as the host delta for the base. In addition to its military space launch mission, Vandenberg Space Force Base also performs space launches for civil and commercial space entities, such as NASA and SpaceX.

History

United States Army

Camp Cooke (1941–1953) 

In 1941, the United States Army embarked on an initiative to acquire lands in the United States to be used to train its infantry and armored forces. These areas needed to be of a varied nature to ensure relevant training. Most of the land was purchased. Smaller parcels were obtained either by lease, license, or as easements. With its flat plateau, surrounding hills, numerous canyons, and relative remoteness from populated areas, the Army was convinced it had found the ideal training location.

Construction of the Army camp began in September 1941. Although its completion was still months away, the Army activated the camp on 5 October 1941, and named it Camp Cooke in honor of Major General Phillip St. George Cooke.

General Cooke was a cavalry officer whose military career spanned almost half a century, beginning with his graduation from West Point in 1827 to his retirement in 1873. He participated in the Mexican War, the Indian Wars, and the Civil War. A native of Virginia, General Cooke remained loyal to the Union during the Civil War. Perhaps his most enduring achievement came when as a colonel during the Mexican War, he led a battalion of Mormons from Missouri to California. The route led by Colonel Cooke in 1847 opened the first wagon route to California, and today the railroad follows much of the early wagon trails.

Although the construction of Camp Cooke continued well into 1942, troop training did not wait. The 5th Armored Division rolled into camp in February and March 1942. From then until the end of the war, other armored and infantry divisions kept up the din before they too left for overseas duty.

Besides the 5th Division, the 6th, 11th, 13th, and 20th Armored Divisions as well as the 86th and 97th Infantry Divisions, and the 2nd Filipino Infantry Regiment were all stationed at Cooke at varying times during the war. Also trained at Cooke were an assortment of anti-aircraft artillery, combat engineer, ordnance, and hospital units. Over 400 separate and distinct outfits passed through Camp Cooke.

As the war progressed, German and Italian prisoners of war (the latter organized into Italian Service Units) were quartered at Camp Cooke. Both groups were kept separate from each other in accordance with the 1929 Geneva Convention on Prisoners of War, and worked on the post at various jobs including mechanical and civil engineering services, clerical positions, food service, and the main laundry. To help relieve the severe labor shortage in the commercial market created by wartime exigencies, the Germans also worked in local communities – mostly in agricultural jobs.

A maximum security army disciplinary barracks was constructed on post property in 1946. Confined to the facility were military prisoners from throughout the Army. When Camp Cooke closed in June 1946, personnel at the disciplinary barracks received the additional duty as installation caretakers. The vast majority of the camp was then leased for agriculture and grazing purposes.

From August 1950 to February 1953, Camp Cooke served as a training installation for units slated for combat in Korea, and as a summer training base for many other reserve units. On 1 February 1953, the camp was again inactivated. The disciplinary barracks, meanwhile, was transferred to the U.S. Bureau of Prisons to house civilian offenders in August 1959. Today it is known as the United States Penitentiary, Lompoc.

In September 2000, veterans of the 40th Infantry Division gathered at Vandenberg Air Force Base to dedicate its Korean War Memorial. In June 2001, most remnants of Camp Cooke, including some barracks used by the 40th Infantry Division during its mobilization for the Korean War, were torn down; only a few buildings, including the boxing annex and the gymnasium annex, were left standing until they too were torn down in 2010.

Known United States Army Units at Camp Cooke 
World War II

 5th Armored Division
 81st Armored Regiment
 6th Armored Division
 50th Armored Infantry Regiment, 6th Armored Division
 11th Armored Division
 13th Armored Division
 20th Armored Division
 86th Infantry Division
 97th Infantry Division
 2nd Filipino Infantry Regiment

Korean War
 40th Infantry Division
 44th Infantry Division

United States Air Force

Cooke Air Force Base 
With the advent of the missile age in the 1950s, an urgent need arose for an adequate training site that could also serve as a first combat ready missile base. In January 1956, a select committee was formed that examined more than 200 potential sites before Camp Cooke was chosen, essentially for the same characteristics the Army found desirable in 1941. Besides its size, remoteness from heavily populated areas, and moderate climate which afforded year-round operations Cooke's coastal location allowed missiles to be launched into the Pacific Ocean without population overflights. This same geographic feature also enabled satellites to be launched into polar orbit directly toward the South Pole without overflying any land mass until reaching Antarctica.

In September 1956, Secretary of the Air Force Donald A. Quarles accepted the committee's recommendation. A few weeks later, on 16 November 1956, Secretary of Defense Charles E. Wilson directed the Army to transfer  of North Camp Cooke to the United States Air Force for use as a missile launch and training base and in June 1957, North Camp Cooke was renamed Cooke Air Force Base (AFB), and on 21 June 1957 it was transferred to the Air Force. In January 1957, however, the Air Force had received access to the camp, and with the arrival of the first airman in February 1957, established on the 15th the 6591st Support Squadron. The initial mission of Cooke AFB was to serve both as a training site for the PGM-17 Thor, SM-65 Atlas, and HGM-25A Titan I missiles, and as an emergency operational facility for Atlas ICBM.

The base was a cluttered mass of dilapidated World War II era structures amid weeds and brush. Roads-mostly gravel and dirt trails-were in need of extensive repair. In late April 1957, parallel renovation and construction programs started. Over the next two years, missile launch and control facilities began to appear. Old buildings were renovated and new ones built, including Capehart military family housing. The work was already in process when the Air Force hosted the official ground breaking ceremonies on 8 May 1957.

To operate Cooke AFB, the 392d Air Base Group was activated, replacing the 6591st Support Squadron on 15 April 1957. With the activation of the 704th Strategic Missile Wing (Atlas) at Cooke on 1 July 1957, the 392d was assigned to the wing. This was the first Air Force ballistic missile wing. On 16 July 1957, the 1st Missile Division, activated three months earlier in Inglewood, California, relocated to Cooke AFB to supervise wing operations. During this formative period, the work of these latter two organizations involved planning for missile operations and training. The Division was assigned to Air Force Ballistic Missile Division (AFBMD) in Inglewood, California, which in turn reported to Air Research and Development Command (ARDC) at Andrews Air Force Base, Maryland.

The launching of the Soviet Sputnik 1 satellite into orbit on 4 October 1957, followed a month later by Sputnik 2 that carried a dog, Laika, into orbit, had military implications and caused an immediate acceleration of the United States Air Force's missile program. As part of the acceleration, on 23 November 1957, the U.S. Department of Defense authorized the peacetime launching of ballistic missiles from Cooke AFB. The Air Force transferred management responsibilities for Cooke AFB from ARDC to the Strategic Air Command (SAC) on 1 January 1958. Along with the transfer, SAC acquired the three ARDC base organizations and responsibility for attaining initial operational capability (IOC) for the nascent U.S. missile force. Their mission also included training missile launch crews.

The reorganization allowed ARDC to retain responsibility for site activation as well as research and development testing of ballistic missiles, also known as Category II testing. These activities were carried out by an AFBMD field office established at Cooke shortly after the transfers of January 1958. Space launches were to be conducted by ARDC and SAC. However, the vast majority of these operations were later handled by ARDC. Sharing the mission at Cooke, the two commands cultivated a close relationship that was to flourish for the next 35 years.

On 12 February 1958, the U.S. Department of Defense transferred executive responsibility for the PGM-19 Jupiter (IRBM) from the U.S. Department of the Army to the U.S. Air Force. Headquarters SAC transferred the 864th Strategic Missile Squadron (IRBM-Jupiter) from Huntsville, Alabama, to Cooke AFB. In April 1958, Headquarters SAC activated the 576th Strategic Missile Squadron (ICBM-Atlas) at Cooke AFB. It was SAC's first ICBM squadron and first Atlas squadron. Initially, it consisted of two "soft" Series D Atlas complexes (576A and 576B). The first had three gantries while the second had three above ground coffin launchers (the term "coffin launcher" is used because the missile was laid on its side horizontally with the enclosure door or coffin-lid situated above, offering enhanced protection for the launcher), similar to those planned for the first squadron in the field. Each complex had one launch control center. Thus, the squadron had a 3 x 2 configuration. In July 1958, construction began at Cooke AFB on the Operational System Test Facility (OSTF) for the Titan I ICBM. This was the prototype of the hardened Titan I launch control facility and consisted of one silo-lift launcher, blockhouse, and associated equipment. The first Thor IRBM arrived at Cooke AFB in August 1958.On 1 January 1958, Lieutenant General David Wade of Louisiana was assigned as commander of the 1st Missile Division at Cooke. There he commanded the first operational missile unit in Air Force history. His commission was twofold:
 maintain operational capability with intercontinental ballistic missiles, and
 establish operational readiness training for the missile crews of the SAC missile sites.

Wade worked to develop the DISCOVERER, SAMOS, and MIDAS orbiting satellite programs.

Base expansion 
The property it acquired was renamed the Naval Missile Facility at Point Arguello. It became a major launch head and range safety center for all missile and satellite launch operations conducted within the PMR.

On 16 November 1963, Secretary of Defense Robert S. McNamara ordered a restructuring in the way the U.S. Department of Defense managed and operated its missile ranges and flight test facilities across the nation. Part of the force restructuring had the Navy transfer major sections of its Pacific Missile Range, including its Point Arguello installation, to the Air Force in two parts. The first transfer occurred on 1 July 1964. In the second part of the transfer, remote properties and mobile resources, explained in detail in the next section, were handed over to Vandenberg on 1 February 1965.

With the Navy's missile program and range authorities scaled back to the area around Point Mugu, the Air Force now assumed full responsibility for missile range safety at Vandenberg and over much of the Pacific Ocean. The Air Force renamed this geographical area the Air Force Western Test Range (AFWTR). The designation remained until 1979 when it was shortened to the Western Test Range.

The final land acquisition at Vandenberg occurred on 1 March 1966, after the Air Force had announced plans to construct Vandenberg Space Launch Complex 6 for its Manned Orbiting Laboratory (MOL) program. Flight safety corridors for the Titan III MOL vehicle reportedly extended south of Point Arguello and inland to an area known as Sudden Ranch. The Air Force sought to purchase this property, but when negotiations with the Sudden Estate Company failed to reach a compromise purchase price, the government turned to condemnation proceedings (under the power of eminent domain). By filing a Declaration of Taking with the federal court in Los Angeles, it obtained almost  of Sudden Ranch. Finalized on 20 December 1968, the federal court established US$9,002,500 as the purchase price for the land. The total amount paid to the company with interest was US$9,842,700.

The annexation of Sudden Ranch increased the size of the base to its present , making Vandenberg the largest Air Force base.

Vandenberg Air Force Base 
On 4 October 1958, Cooke AFB was renamed Vandenberg Air Force Base (AFB), in honor of General Hoyt Vandenberg, the Air Force's second Chief of Staff.

Ballistic missile testing

PGM-17 Thor 

The transition from U.S. Army camp to missile base solidified on 15 December 1958 when Vandenberg AFB successfully launched its first missile, a PGM-17 Thor IRBM (Intermediate Range Ballistic Missile). The launch from Vandenberg inaugurated the intermediate-range ballistic missile portion of the Pacific Missile Range and was fired by a crew from the 1st Missile Division. The first successful launch of a Thor IRBM by a Royal Air Force crew took place at Vandenberg AFB on 16 April 1959. The launch was part of integrated weapon system training. In October 1959, the first combat training launch of a Thor IRBM by a Royal Air Force crew was successful.

On 22 April 1960, the fourth and final British-based Thor IRBM squadron was turned over to the Royal Air Force by the Strategic Air Command, thus completing the deployment of this weapon system in the United Kingdom. The next month, the first missile to be removed from an operational unit and sent to Vandenberg AFB for confidence firing arrived from a Thor IRBM squadron (No. 98 Squadron RAF) in the United Kingdom. Confidence firing was the predecessor of SAC's operational test program.

SM-65 Atlas 

On 16 October 1958, the first Atlas ICBM launcher (576A-1) constructed at Vandenberg AFB, California, was accepted from the contractor by the 1st Missile Division. The first intercontinental ballistic missile, the SM-65D Atlas ICBM, was delivered and was accepted by SAC's 576th Strategic Missile Squadron on 18 February 1959. The first Atlas-D flew on 9 September 1959, and following the successful launch, General Thomas S. Power, CINCSAC, declared the Atlas ICBM to be operational. The following month, equipped with a nuclear warhead, the Atlas at Vandenberg became the first ICBM to be placed on alert in the United States. It was an SM-69D Atlas ICBM (AFSN 58-2190) on launcher 576A-1. In April 1960, the first attempted launch of a Series D Atlas ICBM from a coffin-type launcher (576B-2) was successful. This launcher was the prototype of the ones to be used at the first operational Atlas squadron, the 564th Strategic Missile Squadron, Francis E. Warren Air Force Base, Wyoming. Following this successful launch, Major General David Wade, Commander of the 1st Missile Division, declared the coffin-type launcher to be operational.

In July 1959, construction began on the first Series E Atlas ICBM coffin-type launcher (Atlas operational system test facility #1). On 28 February 1962, the first successful launch of the SM-65E Atlas took place. Construction began on the first SM-65F Atlas ICBM "silo-lift" launcher (Atlas operational system test facility #2) in November 1962. The first Atlas F arrived in June 1961 and the first operationally configured Series F Atlas was successfully launched on 1 August 1962.

During its testing phase, Vandenberg would operate two Atlas-D launch complexes; two Atlas-E, and three Atlas-F silos. The Atlas-Ds were taken off alert at the 576th Strategic Missile Squadron (Complex 576B) in May 1964 as part of the phaseout of the Atlas from active ICBM service. The last Atlas F test launch was on 18 January 1965, and the 576th Strategic Missile Squadron was inactivated on 2 April 1966. The 576th SMS carried out 53 Atlas-D, 7 Atlas-E and 7 Atlas-F test launches between 1959 and 1965.

The Atlas would remain in use as a launch vehicle for satellites from Vandenberg as a space booster configured with an RM-81 Agena upper-stage rocket and the Atlas-Agena would launch many different types of satellites into orbit until its phaseout in the late 1980s.

HGM-25A Titan I 
The HGM-25A Titan I was the United States' first multistage ICBM. When designed and manufactured, the Titan I provided an additional nuclear deterrent to complement the U.S. Air Force's SM-65 Atlas missile. It was the first in a series of Titan rockets, and was an important step in building the Air Force's strategic nuclear forces.

In July 1958, the construction began on the Titan I ICBM Operational System Test Facility (OSTF). This was the prototype of the hardened Titan I launch control facility at its operational sites. It consisted of one silo-lift launcher, blockhouse, and associated equipment. Designated "OSTF-8", the facility was destroyed on 3 December 1960 when the launcher elevator failed while lowering a fully fueled missile back into the silo. There were no injuries. This was the first silo accident at Vandenberg.

The first "silo-lift" launch of the Titan I was successful in September 1961, and the first SAC launch of the ICBM was successful in January 1962. As a result, the Titan I ICBM launch complex (395-A1/A2/A3) at Vandenberg was turned over to the Strategic Air Command 395th Strategic Missile Squadron to perform test launches of the missile.

However, the operational lifetime of the Titan I was short, as Secretary of Defense McNamara announced in November 1964 that all remaining first-generation ICBMs (Series E and F Atlas and Titan I) would be phased out (Project Added Effort) by the end of June 1965.

On 5 March 1965, the last test launch of a Titan I ICBM conducted by the Strategic Air Command at Vandenberg was successful. The 395th SMS performed 19 test launches between 1963 and 1965 before moving on to exclusively Titan II testing. During the 1980s, some Titan I second stages were used as targets for early Strategic Defense Initiative (SDI) testing.

LGM-25C Titan II 

The LGM-25C Titan II ICBM was a second-generation ICBM with storable propellants, all inertial guidance, and in-silo launch capability. Construction of the first Titan II site began in 1962, and eventually Vandenberg operated four Titan II launch complexes.

Most of the testing of the missile was done at Cape Kennedy Air Force Station, Florida by the 6555th Aerospace Test Group, and the first successful underground silo launch of a Titan II ICBM took place at Vandenberg by the 395th SMS in April 1963. The first fully operational test took place in March 1965.

On 25 March 1966, the 200th SAC missile launched from Vandenberg AFB, California was a Titan II. The operational testing of the Titan II continued until 1985. Like its predecessor the Atlas ICBM, the Titan II GLV a derivative of that missile was used to launch Project Gemini spacecraft and the Titan 23G was used as a space booster to launch satellites. The final launch of a Titan II was made in 2003 when the last Titan IIG was expended.

LGM-30 Minuteman 

The advent of solid-propellant gave the three-stage LGM-30 Minuteman ICBM a major advantage over earlier liquid propellant ICBMs. In February 1961, the construction began on Minuteman ICBM test launch facilities at Vandenberg. Silos 394A-1 through A-7 were the first constructed for use by the SAC 394th Strategic Missile Squadron.

LGM-30A Minuteman IA flight tests began in September 1962. The first Minuteman IB test took place in May 1963. On 24 February 1966, the first attempted salvo (simultaneous) launch of two model "A" Minuteman I ICBMs from Vandenberg silos LF-04 (394A-3) and LF-06 (394-A5) was successful. This launch demonstrated the multiple countdown and launch techniques that would be used at operational bases under actual combat conditions. Minuteman I testing continued until 1968.

LGM-30F Minuteman II testing began in August 1965 with the first launch conducted by Air Force Systems Command, was successful. The missile flew  down the Pacific Missile Range and its reentry vehicle impacted in the target area.

On 22 October 1970, the first attempted OT GT70F (Salvo) operational test launch (simultaneous) launch of two Minuteman II ICBMs was successful from LF-25 and LF-26. The last Minuteman II phase I operational test was performed in April 1972.

The first LGM-30G Minuteman III phase II operational test was launched on 5 December 1972 from the LF-02 silo. The ICBM flew  downrange before impacting in the Pacific Ocean. This was the beginning of Minuteman III launches which continue to this day from Vandenberg.

In July 1974, the initial training of Minuteman missile combat crews, formerly performed by Air Training Command (ATC) instructors at Vandenberg AFB, California, was incorporated into the 4315th Combat Crew Training Squadron's Operational Readiness Training (ORT) program at Vandenberg. As a result of this action, the entire Minuteman missile combat training, from beginning (initial training) to end (upgrade training) became the responsibility of Strategic Air Command.

SAC launched two Minuteman III ICBMs from Vandenberg AFB during exercise Global Shield, a comprehensive exercise of SAC's nuclear forces on 10 July 1979 from LF 08 and LF 09. One of these Global Shield missions, Glory Trip 40 GM, was the last Minuteman III phase I operational test flight. The missiles were launched 12 seconds apart by a SAC task force from the 90th Strategic Missile Wing, Francis E. Warren Air Force Base, Wyoming.

Glory Trip 77GM, a Minuteman III Operational Test in September 1980, became the longest Minuteman flight test when its payload impacted a broad ocean area target over  downrange.

LGM-118 Peacekeeper 

The last ICBM tested from Vandenberg was the LGM-118 Peacekeeper (MX) ICBM beginning in June 1983. In addition to having a longer range than earlier ICBMs, the Peacekeeper could deliver up to 10 reentry vehicles to separate targets. It was intended as a replacement for the LGM-30 Minuteman, but it suffered from a long development time, and was retired in 2005 before the Minuteman because of arms reduction treaties.

The first Peacekeeper ICBM was launched by Air Force Systems Command from an aboveground canister-type launch facility from Launch Complex TP-01 on 17 June 1983. This was the first "cold launch" of a missile at Vandenberg AFB, the missile reaching  downrange. Two more test launches were conducted in 1983 from Launch Complex TP-01.

The first Peacekeeper with a Mark-21 test reentry vehicle was flight-tested from TP-01 on 15 June 1984. The Mark-21 resembled the reentry vehicle intended for the Peacekeeper weapon system. Two more test launches were conducted in 1984, the missile from TP-01. Air Force Systems Command conducted the final Peacekeeper launch from the aboveground TP-01 launch pad on 30 June 1985.

The first silo launch from LF-05 took place on 24 August 1985 from LF-08. LF-02 began to be used in 1986 for additional launches. On 23 August 1986 the first launch of a completely operational hardware configured missile and launch facility, and also the first Peacekeeper launch by a SAC combat crew under the control of Air Force Systems Command took place from silo LF-02.

A new Peacekeeper Missile Procedures Trainer was dedicated in March 1987. The US$17 million facility featured a state-of-the-art computer based simulator which would be used to train and evaluate missile crew members. The first LGM-118 Peacekeepers were deployed to Francis E. Warren Air Force Base in Wyoming that year. LGM-118 Peacekeeper test launches continued from Vandenberg with a third silo, LF-05 becoming operational in March 1990. The final launch of a LGM-118 Peacekeeper 33PA took place on 21 July 2004 before the missile was retired from service.

Ground Based Midcourse Defense Interceptor 
The latest missile deployed at Vandenberg in 2005 is the Ground-based Interceptor (GBI) missile suborbital booster for the U.S. Missile Defense Agency's Ground-based Midcourse Defense system's EKV ballistic missile kill vehicle. It is part of a National missile defense system advocated by president George W. Bush. The OBV is under development by Orbital Sciences; for every interceptor missile there is a missile silo and a Silo Interface Vault (SIV), which is an underground electronics room adjacent to the silo. The basic OBV consists of the upper three stages and guidance system from the Taurus orbital launch vehicle (essentially a wingless Pegasus-XL). The developmental OBV is launched from an open pad; the operational version is to be silo-launched.

The first test firing of the OVB took place from former Atlas-F pad 576-E on 6 February 2003. Launch silo LF-23 is used for ongoing silo testing, with target missiles consisting of surplus inert Minuteman ICBM second and third stages being launched from the Kwajalein Meck launch site in the Pacific Range.

Early space exploration 
The world's first polar orbit satellite, Discoverer 1, launched from Vandenberg on 28 February 1959. The launch vehicle for this mission consisted of a Thor-Agena combination. The Discoverer series of satellites provided other significant firsts for Vandenberg. For instance, in August 1960, the data capsule was ejected from Discoverer XIII in orbit and recovered from the Pacific Ocean to become the first man-made object ever retrieved from space. A week later, on 19 August 1960, the descending capsule from Discoverer XIV was snared by an aircraft in flight for the first air recovery in history. Shrouded in a cover story of scientific research, Discoverer was actually the cover name for CORONA, America's first photo reconnaissance satellite program. The publicized Discoverer series came to an end on 13 January 1962 after 38 launches (or launch attempts).

Over the years, unmanned satellites of every description and purpose, including international satellites, were placed in orbit from Vandenberg by a widening variety of boosters. Among the parade of newer space boosters are the Titan IV (March 1991), Taurus (March 1994), Pegasus (April 1995), Delta II (February 1996), Atlas IIAS (December 1999), Minotaur (2000), and beginning in late 2005, the Falcon 1, the Delta IV, and Atlas V vehicles.

The most ambitious Air Force endeavors at Vandenberg were the Manned Orbiting Laboratory (MOL) and the Space Shuttle programs. The MOL vehicle consisted of a Titan III booster carrying a modified Gemini space capsule (Gemini B) attached to a space laboratory. Construction work for MOL began at Space Launch Complex-6 (SLC-6) on South Vandenberg in March 1966. President Richard Nixon canceled the estimated US$3 billion program in June 1969, as a result of cost overruns, completion delays, emerging new technologies, and the expense of fighting the Vietnam War. SLC-6 remained closed for the next decade.

Space Shuttle 

In 1972, Vandenberg was selected as the West Coast Space Shuttle launch and landing site, but it was never used as such.

Space Launch Complex-6 (SLC-6, pronounced as "Slick Six"), originally built for the abandoned Manned Orbital Laboratory project, was extensively modified for shuttle operations. Over US$4 billion was spent on the modifications to the complex and construction of associated infrastructure. The original Mobile Service Tower (MST) was lowered in height and two new flame ducts were added for the shuttle's solid rocket boosters. Additional modifications or improvements, included liquid hydrogen and liquid oxygen storage tanks, a payload preparation room, payload changeout room, a new launch tower with escape system for the shuttle crewmembers, sound suppression system and water reclamation area and a Shuttle Assembly Building were added to the original complex.

The existing 8,500-foot (2,590 m) runway and overruns on the North Base flightline were lengthened to 15,000 feet (4,580 m) to accommodate end-of-mission landings, along with construction of the Precision Approach Path Indicator (PAPI) lights/large triangle arrows at both ends of the runway. Turn-around servicing and refurbishing of the Space Shuttle orbiter would be accomplished in the adjacent Orbiter Maintenance and Checkout Facility (OMCF). The Mate-Demate Facility, to load and unload the Orbiter from the Boeing 747 Shuttle Carrier Aircraft (SCA), was changed from the large structure found at Dryden Flight Research Center and Kennedy Space Center, to a transportable "erector set-like" Orbiter Lifting Frame (OLF). This facility design change was due to the possibility of needing to support a landing at a location where there was no facility to load the Orbiter onto the SCA. The OLF could be disassembled, loaded onto two C-5 aircraft, shipped to the overseas Orbiter landing site, and reassembled to load the Orbiter onto the Boeing 747. To transport the Orbiter from the OMCF (on North Vandenberg AFB) to SLC-6, the  route was upgraded to accommodate a 76-wheeled vehicle, built by Commetto in Italy specifically to carry the Orbiter on its large flat deck utilizing the three external tank interface points, versus towing the Orbiter on its landing gear that long distance.

Modification of SLC-6 to support polar missions had been problematic and expensive. SLC-6 was still being prepared for its first Shuttle launch, mission STS-62-A targeted for 15 October 1986, when the Challenger disaster grounded the Shuttle fleet and set in motion a chain of events that finally led to the decision to cancel all west coast shuttle launches. The orbiter transporter was sent to Kennedy Space Center in Florida after the Vandenberg AFB launch site was abandoned and was used to transport the Orbiter from the Orbiter Processing Facility to the Vehicle Assembly Building.

Persistent site technical problems and a joint decision by the Air Force and NASA to consolidate Shuttle operations at the Kennedy Space Center, following the Challenger disaster in 1986, resulted in the official termination of the Shuttle program at Vandenberg on 26 December 1989.

Had the space shuttle program been successful at SLC-6, the West Coast operation would have contrasted with that at the Kennedy Space Center by creating the orbiter stack directly on the launch pad, rather than assembling it and then moving it. Three movable buildings on rails, the Launch Tower, Mobile Service Building and Payload Changeout Room were used to assemble the Shuttle orbiter, external tank and SRBs. These buildings were designed to protect the shuttle "stack" from high winds in the area and were used during a series of "fit tests" utilizing the space shuttle Enterprise in 1985.

Delta IV 
Since the demise of the shuttle program at Vandenberg, SLC-6 was once again reconfigured, this time to support polar-orbit satellite launches by the new Delta IV family of launch vehicles, utilizing a Common Core Booster for class sizes all the way up to and including the Delta IV (Heavy) launcher. As it is currently configured, the  launch site features structures similar to Boeing's Delta IV SLC-37 launch site at Cape Canaveral Space Force Station in Florida, with a Fixed Umbilical Tower, Mobile Service Tower, Fixed Pad Erector, Launch Control Center and Operations Building, and a Horizontal Integration Facility. SLC-6 also features a Mobile Assembly Shelter that protects the rocket from adverse weather.

The first of the Delta IV launch vehicles to fly from SLC-6 successfully lifted off at 20:33 PDT on 27 June 2006 when a Delta IV Medium+ (4,2) rocket lofted NROL-22, a classified satellite for the National Reconnaissance Office, into orbit. The payload was successfully deployed approximately 54 minutes later.

Atlas V 
The Atlas V was developed by Lockheed Martin as part of the United States Air Force (USAF) Evolved Expendable Launch Vehicle (EELV) program. The Atlas V launches from Space Launch Complex-3E (SLC-3E). Lockheed Martin Commercial Launch Services markets the Atlas V to government and commercial customers worldwide.

The first Atlas V launch vehicle to fly from SLC-3E was launched on 19 March 2008 for the National Reconnaissance Office (NRO).

All Atlas V launches from Vandenberg have been successful.

SpaceX Falcon 

SpaceX briefly used SLC-3W during the early development of the Falcon 1 launch vehicle, and later moved operations to Space Launch Complex 4-East (SLC-4E). SpaceX refurbished SLC-4E for Falcon 9 and Falcon Heavy launches, in a 24-month process that began in early 2011. The draft environmental impact assessment with a finding of "no significant impact" was published in February 2011. Demolition began on the pad's fixed and mobile service towers in summer 2011.

By late 2012, SpaceX continued to anticipate that the initial launch from the Vandenberg pad would be in 2013, but would be a Falcon 9 launch — actually, a heavily modified and much larger Falcon 9 v1.1. As the pad was nearing completion in February 2013, the first Falcon 9 launch was scheduled for summer 2013 and was finally launched on 29 September 2013. This was the maiden flight of the Falcon 9 v1.1 evolution, carrying Canada's CASSIOPE satellite. In October 2018, SpaceX landed a Falcon 9 booster on a Vandenberg ground pad for the first time.

Boeing X-37B 
The Boeing X-37B, a reusable unmanned spacecraft operated by the Space Force, also known as the Orbital Test Vehicle (OTV), has landed at Vandenberg in the past. On 3 December 2010, the X-37B spaceplane successfully landed at the base after 224 days in space thus performing the first autonomous orbital landing onto a runway conducted by a U.S spacecraft. Since then, the X-37B has successfully landed on the 15,000-foot runway at Vandenberg two more times, on 16 June 2012 after 468 days in orbit and again on 14 October 2014 after 674 days in orbit. All of the X-37B missions thus far have been launched from Florida, the first four using expendable Atlas V rockets from Cape Canaveral Space Force Station and the fifth on a reusable SpaceX Falcon 9 from Kennedy Space Center.

Major commands to which assigned 
 Air Research and Development Command, 21 June 1957
 Strategic Air Command, 1 January 1958
 Air Force Space Command, 15 January 1991 – 20 December 2019
 Space Operations Command, 20 December 2019 – present

Major units assigned 

 1st Strategic Aerospace Division, 16 July 1957 – 1 September 1991
 392d Strategic Missile Wing, 18 October – 20 December 1961
 Space and Missile Test Center, 1 April 1970 – 1 July 1980
 Air Force Space Test Center, Provisional, 2 January – 15 May 1964
 Air Force Western Test Range, 5 May 1964 – 1 April 1970
 Redesignated Western Space and Missile Center, 1 October 1979
 Redesignated 30th Space Wing, 1 November 1991 – present
 704th Strategic Missile Wing (ICBM), 1 July 1957 – 1 July 1959
 6565th Test Wing, 20 October 1960
 Redesignated 6595th Aerospace Test Wing, 1 April 1961 – 1 October 1979
 10th Aerospace Defense Group, 1 January 1967 – 31 December 1971 (Aerospace Defense Command)
 30th Launch Group, 1 December 2003 – present
 30th Operations Group, 19 November 1991 – present
 6595th Missile Test Group, 1 May 1970 – 1 October 1990
 6595th Space (later Satellite, later Aerospace) Test Group, 1 May 1970 – 1 October 1990
 6595th Space Transportation (later Shuttle) Test Group, 21 May 1979 – 30 September 1987
 2d Space Launch Squadron, 19 November 1991 – 31 October 2005; 1 June 2019 – present
 4th Space Launch Squadron, 15 April 1994 – 29 June 1998; 1 December 2003 – 31 May 2019
 10th Aerospace Defense Squadron, 15 November 1963 – 1 January 1967; 31 December 1970 – 1 November 1979
 394th Missile Testing Squadron (ICBM-Atlas), 1 April – 15 December 1958
 394th Strategic Missile Squadron (ICBM-Titan), 1 July 1960 – 30 June 1976
 Redesignated 394th Test Maintenance Squadron, 1 July 1976
 Redesignated 394th Operational Missile Maintenance Squadron, 1 September 1991
 Redesignated 394th Field Missile Maintenance Squadron, 1 September 1994 – present
 395th Strategic Missile Squadron (ICBM-Titan), 1 February 1959 – 31 December 1969
 576th Strategic Missile Squadron (ICBM-Atlas), 1 April 1958 – 2 April 1966
 Redesignated 576th Flight Test Squadron, 1 September 1991 – present
 Assigned to Air Force Global Strike Command, 1 December 2009 – present
 644th Strategic Missile Squadron, 15 January – 1 November 1959
 670th Aircraft Control and Warning Squadron, 5 May 1950 – 2 August 1951
 4315th Combat Crew Training Squadron, 1 May 1958 – 15 January 1991

United States Space Force

Vandenberg Space Force Base 
On 14 May 2021, the base was renamed Vandenberg Space Force Base, in keeping with the expansion and standing up of the Space Force.

Role and operations 

The host unit at Vandenberg SFB is the Space Launch Delta 30 (SLD 30; formerly known as 30th Space Wing, 30th SW).
In 1994, 30th SW won the Airforce Outstanding Unit Award for teamwork. It beat hundreds of bases worldwide and was noted for seamlessly integrating the Western Space and Missile Center into a wing that handles ICBM, space and missile testing, and spacelift missions. 
The SLD 30 is home to the Western Range, manages Department of Defense space and missile testing, and places satellites into near-polar orbits from the West Coast. Wing personnel also support the Air Force's Minuteman III Intercontinental Ballistic Missile Force Development Test and Evaluation program. The Western Range begins at the coastal boundaries of Vandenberg and extends westward from the California coast to the Western Pacific, including sites in Hawaii. Operations involve dozens of federal and commercial interests.

The delta is organized into operations, launch, mission support and medical groups, along with several directly assigned staff agencies.

 30th Operations Group

 The 30th Operations Group provides the core capability for West Coast spacelift and range operations.  Operations professionals are responsible for operating and maintaining the Western Range for spacelift, missile test launch, aeronautical and space surveillance missions.

 30th Mission Support Group

 The 30th Mission Support Group supports the third largest Air Force Base  in the United States.  It is also responsible for quality-of-life needs, housing, personnel, services, civil engineering, contracting and security.

 30th Medical Group

 The 30th Medical Group provides medical, dental, bio-environmental and public health services for people assigned to Vandenberg Space Force Base, their families and retirees.

Space and Missile Heritage Center 
The Space and Missile Heritage Center is located at Space Launch Complex 10, site of the first IRBM tests of the Thor and Discoverer (aka CORONA) spy satellite series of launches. It is Vandenberg's only National Historic Landmark that is open for regularly scheduled tours through the 30th Space Wing's Public Affairs office.
The Center preserves and displays artifacts and memorabilia to interpret the evolution of missile and spacelift activity at Vandenberg from the beginning of the Cold War through current non-classified developments in military, commercial, and scientific space endeavors.

The current display area is made up of two exhibits, the "Chronology of the Cold War" and the "Evolution of Technology". The exhibits incorporate a combination of launch complex models, launch consoles, rocket engines, re-entry vehicles, audiovisual and computer displays as well as hands-on interaction where appropriate. There are plans to evolve the center in stages from the current exhibit areas as restorations of additional facilities are completed.

Based units 
Notable units based at Vandenberg Space Force Base.

Units marked GSU are Geographically Separate Units, which although based at Vandenberg, are subordinate to a parent unit based at another location.

United States Space Force 
Space Operations Command (SpOC)
 Space Launch Delta 30 (SLD 30)
 Headquarters Space Launch Delta 30
 30th Comptroller Squadron
 30th Operations Group 
 2nd Space Launch Squadron
 30th Operations Support Squadron
 30th Space Communications Squadron
 30th Launch Support Squadron
 30th Medical Group
 30th Medical Operations Squadron
 30th Medical Support Squadron
 30th Mission Support Group
 30th Civil Engineer Squadron
 30th Contracting Squadron
 30th Force Support Squadron
 30th Logistics Readiness Squadron
 30th Security Forces Squadron
 Space Delta 5
 Space Delta 6
 21st Space Operations Squadron (GSU)
 65th Cyber Squadron
 Space Training and Readiness Command (STARCOM)
 Space Delta 1
 1st Delta Operations Squadron
 533rd Training Squadron

United States Air Force 
Air Education and Training Command (AETC)

 Second Air Force
 381st Training Group
 81st Training Support Squadron
 532rd Training Squadron

Air Force Global Strike Command (AFGSC)

 576th Flight Test Squadron

Air National Guard (ANG)

 California Air National Guard
 195th Wing
 195th Operations Group
 148th Space Operations Squadron (GSU)
 216th Space Control Squadron (GSU)

Department of Defense 
United States Space Command

 Combined Force Space Component Command
 Combined Space Operations Center

Geography 

Much of the base is rugged, mountainous, and undeveloped; predominant groundcover includes chaparral with coastal sage scrub and oak woodland. Because of its protected nature—none of the backcountry areas are open to the public or to any kind of development—the base contains some of the highest quality coastal habitat remaining in southern or central California. It is home to numerous threatened or endangered species, including Gambel's watercress (Nasturtium gambellii). An optical tracking station is located at the top of the peak, which overlooks the various space launch complexes. The Amtrak Coast Starlight and Pacific Surfliner trains travel along the coast, providing a splendid view and one of the few ways for the public to see these remote areas. Conversely, State Route 1, California's Pacific Coast Highway, avoids these coastal protected areas and instead turns inland to serve the base's eastern side. The Breeze Bus provides service between the base, Santa Maria, and Lompoc.

Beaches 
Surf Beach is open to the public, while Wall and Minuteman beaches are restricted to those with regular access to the base. Sections of these three beaches are closed between 1 March and 30 September every year during the nesting season of the Western Snowy Plover. The closures are in place to protect the bird under the Endangered Species Act. If a set number of trespass violations have been reached during any nesting season (50 for Surf, 10 for Wall, 10 for Minuteman), the beach is closed entirely.

Surf Beach is adjacent to the Surf Amtrak station, just south of Ocean Beach Park, run by the Santa Barbara County Parks Division. On 22 October 2010, 19-year-old Lucas Ransom, a University of California, Santa Barbara (UCSB) student, was killed by a great white shark near Surf Beach. On 23 October 2012, 38-year-old Francisco Javier Solorio Jr. was killed by a shark near Ocean Beach.

Wildlife 
Snowy plovers nest on the beach.

Demographics

The United States Census Bureau has designated Vandenberg Space Force Base as a separate census-designated place (CDP) for statistical purposes, covering the base's residential population. Per the 2020 census, the population was 3,559. The CDP was formerly known as Vandenberg Air Force Base, reflecting the base's former name.

2020 census

Note: the US Census treats Hispanic/Latino as an ethnic category. This table excludes Latinos from the racial categories and assigns them to a separate category. Hispanics/Latinos can be of any race.

See also 

 Point Arguello Light

References

Further reading

External links 

Official sites
 Vandenberg Space Force Base official site
 History/Chronology of Vandenberg AFB
 Space and Missile Heritage Center

Other
 Vandenberg Air Force Base Spacecraft and Rocket Listing
 California Spaceport Website
 Vandenberg AFB Launch Schedule
 Vandenberg AFB Launch History
 Vandenberg AFB at GlobalSecurity.org
 

Vandenberg Space Force Base
Airports in Santa Barbara County, California
Buildings and structures in Santa Barbara County, California
Census-designated places in Santa Barbara County, California
Lockheed Martin-associated military facilities
Spaceports in the United States
1941 establishments in California
Populated coastal places in California
Military airbases established in 1941